Astrology has been a topic of debate among Jews for over 2000 years. While not a Jewish practice or teaching as such, astrology made its way into Jewish thought, as can be seen in the many references to it in the Talmud. Astrological statements became accepted and worthy of debate and discussion by Torah scholars. Opinions varied: some rabbis rejected the validity of astrology; others accepted its validity but forbid practicing it; still others thought its practice to be meaningful and permitted. In modern times, as science has rejected the validity of astrology, many Jewish thinkers have similarly rejected it; though some continue to defend the pro-astrology views that were common among pre-modern Jews.

In pre-modern Hebrew, astrology was known as hokmat ha-mazalot (חוכמת המזלות), "the science of the constellations".

In the Hebrew Bible
As far as can be known from the Bible, astrology was not practiced in ancient Israel during the First Temple period. The Torah contains no references to astrology, and in the Nevi'im (Prophets) and Ketuvim (Writings), only obscure references to Babylonian astrologers exist.

Two commandments in the Torah have been understood by some later authorities as a basis to forbid astrology:

These commandments are understood by some rabbinic authorities as forbidding astrology, while others limit these mitzvot to other forms of soothsaying, and thus view astrology as permissible.

The Hebrew word mazalot, which literally means "constellations", is used twice in the Hebrew Bible. Specific constellations are also mentioned, such as Orion (named "Kesil" "כסיל", literally: "fool"; possibly etymologically connected with "Kislev", the name for the ninth month of the Hebrew calendar (i.e. November–December), which, in turn, may derive from the Hebrew root K-S-L as in the words "kesel, kisla" (כֵּסֶל, כִּסְלָה, hope, positiveness), that is, hope for winter rains), which is mentioned three times: Job 9:9 ("He is the maker of the Bear and Orion"), Job 38:31 ("Can you loosen Orion's belt?"), and Amos 5:8 ("He who made the Pleiades and Orion").

Astrologers from Babylon were called Kasdim/Kasdin (Chaldeans) in the Book of Daniel. In rabbinic literature, the term Chaldeans later was often used as a synonym with those who practiced astrology.

In the Second Temple period
For most of the Second Temple period, discussion of the planets in Jewish literature was extremely rare.
Some historians hold that astrology slowly made its way into the Jewish community through syncretism with ancient Hellenistic culture. In prophesizing on the destruction of the Temple, the Sibylline oracles praise Jewish ancestors who "have no concern about the course of the sun's revolution, nor the moon's [..] Nor soothsayers, nor wizards, nor enchanters [...] Neither do they astrologize with skill of the Chaldeans, nor astronomize; O For these are all deceptive"; although the author of the Encyclopaedia Judaica article on astrology holds that this view is mistaken.

The early historian Josephus censures the people for ignoring what he thought were signs foreshadowing the destruction of the Temple in Jerusalem.

There are many references to astrology in the apocrypha. The Book of Jubilees said that Abraham overcame the beliefs of astrologers by accepting one God.

In the Talmudic period
In early classical rabbinic works written in the land of Israel (Jerusalem Talmud and midrash compilations) astrologers are known as astrologos and astrologiyya. In early classical rabbinic works written in Babylonia, astrologers were called kaldiyyim, kalda'ei, and iztagninin.

Is astrology valid?

The most popular form of astrological belief in this period was to regard certain periods of time as lucky or unlucky. For example, Rabbi Yehoshua ben Levi listed the character traits associated with one's having been born on specific days of the week; R' Hanina dissented and said that character traits are determined by the planet under whose influence one was born. An announcement is found to the effect that it is dangerous to drink water on Tuesday and Friday evenings. Samuel of Nehardea, a physician and astrologer, taught that it was dangerous to bleed a patient on Tuesday (as well as on Monday or Thursday for a different reason), because Mars reigns at the midheaven. The new moon was likewise regarded as an unfavorable season for bleeding, as were also the third of the month and the day preceding a festival.

Ecclesiastes Rabbah states that the rulers of some non-Jewish nations were experts in astrology, and that King Solomon too had expertise in this realm.

In general, many people quoted in the Talmud believed that in theory astrology had merit as some kind of science, but they were skeptical that astrological signs could be interpreted correctly or in a practical fashion. In one place the Talmud states that astrologers "gaze and know not at what they gaze at, ponder and know not what they ponder."

According to Jacob Neusner, in this period "magic, astrology, and occult sciences... were regarded as advanced sciences... to reject them, the Jews and their leaders would have had to ignore the most sophisticated technological attainments of contemporary civilization."

Does astrology apply to Israel?

Some rabbis held that the stars generally do control the fate of people and nations, but Abraham and his descendants were elevated by their covenant with God, and thus achieve an elevated level of free will.

In the Talmud, two rabbis (R. Yohanan and Rav) held that "there is no mazal (literally "constellation") for Israel, but only for the nations", while one held the contrary, that astrology does apply to Israel.

It is said that Abraham predicted via astrological tablets that he would have no second son, but God said to him, "Away with your astrology; for Israel there is no mazal!" The birth of his second son, the patriarch Isaac, then disproves the idea that astrology applies to Israel. Genesis Rabbah states that Abraham was not an astrologer, but rather a prophet, inasmuch as only those beneath the stars could be subject to their influence; but that Abraham was above them.

Is it permitted for Jews to practice astrology?

Samuel of Nehardea is the only sage in the Talmud who seriously studied astrology, yet he held that it was not compatible with Judaism. Quoting Deuteronomy 30:12, "The Law is not in the Heavens", he is reputed to have taught that "Torah cannot go together with the art that studies the heavens".

Similarly, Jose of Hutzal prohibited consulting an astrologer: "We are not permitted to appeal to the Chaldeans, for it is written, 'You shall be perfect with the Lord your God'".

Several sources record that Rabbi Akiva prohibited the practice of astrology.

The biblical Patriarch Abraham is said to have known astrology, with many people congregated before him to seek advice. This may indicate a more positive attitude towards the practice of astrology.

In the medieval era
Many rabbis in the Geonic era (after the close of the Talmud, early medieval period) discussed the varying Talmudic and midrashic views on astrology. One responsum takes a middle view: Otzar HaGeonim 113, concludes that astrology has some reality, in that the stars give a person certain inclinations; however each person has the ability to overcome their own inclinations, and thus maintains free will.

Astrology was practised by some Jews throughout the Middle Ages, both as a professional art and as a science. Coming from the East, Jews were sometimes looked upon as heirs and successors of the Chaldeans. For this reason, Jews sometimes were regarded by the Western world as masters of astrology. Their supposed power over destiny on occasion filled the multitudes with awe and fear.

Abraham ibn Ezra was a follower of astrology, which he calls "a sublime science." Besides translating another Jewish philosopher Mashallah's astrological work Questions and another work of this author on the eclipse of the moon from the Arabic into Hebrew, he wrote Nativity, Sentences of the Constellations, Reshit Hokhmah (Beginning of Wisdom), Book of the World, a treatise on the Planets, a treatise on the Luminaries, and a horoscope. He often refers to astrology in his Bible commentaries. To him heaven with its constellations is "the book of life," in which man's destiny is written, and against which there is recourse to God as "the Almighty," who overrules all these influences. A modern scholar summarizes Ibn Ezra's attitude as follows: "The deity has delegated to the stars the governance of the sublunar world. Israel [Jews], however, enjoys a special status, which is manifest most decisively in its possession of the Torah. As long as a Jew is engaged in the study and observance of the Torah, he is linked to a spiritual realm which is itself superior to the stars. In this way a Jew may liberate himself from the decrees of the stars."

Dunash ibn Tamim (850-956 CE, North Africa), who wrote a commentary on the Kabbalistic work Sefer Yetzirah, wrote a treatise on astronomy which rejected astrology.

Abraham ben David of Posquières asserted the influence of the stars upon destiny, while also contending that by faith in God man may overcome this influence.

Gersonides believed that astrology was real, and developed a naturalistic, non-supernatural explanation of how it works. For Gersonides, astrology was:
founded on the metaphysical doctrine of the dependence of all earthly occurrences upon the heavenly world. The general connection imparted to the prophet by the active intellect is the general order of the astrological constellation. The constellation under which a man is born determines his nature and fate, and constellations as well determine the life span of nations....The active intellect knows the astrological order, from the most general form of the constellations to their last specification, which in turn contains all of the conditions of occurrence of a particular event. Thus, when a prophet deals with the destiny of a particular person or human group, he receives from the active intellect a knowledge of the order of the constellations, and with sufficient precision to enable him to predict its fate in full detail.....
This astrological determinism has only one limitation. The free will of man could shatter the course of action ordained for him by the stars; prophecy could therefore predict the future on the basis of astrological determination only insofar as the free will of man does not break through the determined course of things.

Gersonides believed astrology to be a science that predicts events according to set laws of nature (albeit, a different set than the ones we are used to). He also believed that a person who has perfected his thinking could interact with the laws of nature through the active intellect. Gersonides thus thought of himself as creating a rationalist and non-supernatural theology. In this sense, there is a similarity between Gersonides and Maimonides.

Shlomo ibn Aderet - in a responsum commonly but mistakenly attributed to Nahmanides - wrote that while one may not ask an astrologer for a prediction, astrology itself is real. He states rules that one must ultimately trust in God, and not in any lesser force, as God can perform miracles to overcome the patterns of nature. As such, he concludes that one is forbidden to ask an astrologer for a prediction, but one may act on the words of an astrologer if advice is freely given.

Nahmanides himself wrote that astrology is a real facet of nature, which astrologers can interpret but not reliably; Jews are forbidden to use astrology and instead required to consult prophets, whose word is always reliable.

Maimonides answered an inquiry concerning astrology, addressed to him from Marseilles. He responded that man should believe only what can be supported either by rational proof, by the evidence of the senses, or by trustworthy authority. He states that he has studied astrology and that it does not deserve to be described as a science. He ridicules the idea that a man's fate could depend on the constellations, arguing that such a theory would rob life of purpose and would make man a slave of destiny.

Isaac ben Joseph ibn Pulgar (14th century, Spain) was a Jewish philosopher who wrote against astrology.

The Arba'ah Turim, an early code of Jewish law, brings the views of Maimonides. Joseph Karo in his commentary "Beit Yosef" quotes Nahmanides, whereas in his code the Shulkhan Arukh, he rules that consulting an astrologer is forbidden, without addressing the question of whether astrology is effective.

Moshe Chaim Luzzatto
Moshe Chaim Luzzatto discusses the influence of stars on humanity and events on earth. He gave two reasons for the existence of stars and planets. The first is that stars and planets maintain the existence of all physical things on earth, acting as the means by which spiritual forces are transmitted to physical entities. The second is that events on earth are also initiated through planetary and stellar activity. Luzzatto states that each earthly phenomenon is assigned to a specific star, which controls it. Quoting the Talmudic dictum in Shabbos 156a – "for Israel, there is no mazal ("luck", literally "planet" or "constellation")", he also states that higher powers (i.e. God or angels) may overcome the influences of this system, and that they typically do so for Jews.

Luzzatto notes that the laws and rules governing this system of astrological influence are extremely complex, and not easily ascertainable through direct observation; thus astrologers are rarely able to predict the future accurately or clearly. The accuracy of their predictions is further reduced by the aforementioned propensity of divine providence to intervene and override the system. This, Luzzatto states, explains the use of the word me'asher ("something") in Isaiah 47:13 ("Now let the astrologers, stargazers and fortunetellers stand up and tell you something about what will come upon you"); in Luzzatto's view, this means they can tell you something about the future, but not everything.

Views in the modern era

Strictures against astrology appear in the official Torah commentary of Conservative Judaism and on the official website of Reform Judaism, and a number of Conservative and Reform rabbis have written against the practice. The opinions of contemporary Orthodox rabbis are divided; some reject astrology altogether, while others continue to follow pre-modern opinions that accept the validity of astrology but limit its practice.

Commenting on Deuteronomy 18:9-12, Etz Hayim, the official Torah commentary of Conservative Judaism writes "Hence the use of astrology is prohibited (BT Pesachim 113b)." Similarly, Conservative rabbi Simchah Roth commented negatively on astrology.

Conservative Rabbi Aaron Kriegel writes:

On the Union for Reform Judaism website Jeffrey K. Salkin derides astrology as "a new-age trap":

Modern Orthodox rabbis have written against the practice as well, some seeing it as forbidden by Jewish law. For instance, 
Modern Orthodox Rabbi Ephraim Buchwald writes:

The Chief Rabbi of the United Kingdom (Orthodox) Jonathan Sacks, writes:

In contrast, Modern Orthodox Rabbi Nachum Amsel writes:

An article published by the Orthodox Union takes a similar approach:

Aryeh Kaplan, known for his rationalist synthesis of modern scientific thinking and Kabbalah, and creator of a modern translation of Derekh Hashem, echoes the viewpoint of its author (Moshe Chaim Luzzatto) on astrology. In his translation of and commentary on Sefer Yetzirah, Kaplan writes:

However, Kaplan also writes,

Kabbalistic astrology
Kabbalistic astrology, also called mazal or mazalot, ("zodiac," "destiny") is a system of astrology based upon the kabbalah. It is used to interpret and delineate a person's birth chart, seeking to understand it through a kabbalistic lens.

Most astrologers cast and use horoscopes to depict planetary placements which are believed to influence daily activities. Kabbalistic astrologers tend to take a slightly different approach because they wish to observe the planets as they relate to each sephira in the Tree of Life.

Each sephira points to a specific character trait. Each sephira in the trestleboard corresponds with a specific planet and is therefore closely aligned with the celestial art of astrology.

Hebrew calendar correlation to zodiac

The work Sefer HaMazalot identified the 12 constellations of the zodiac with the 12 months of the Hebrew calendar. The correspondence of the constellations with their names in Hebrew and the months is as follows:

Some scholars identified the 12 signs of the zodiac with the 12 sons of Jacob/Twelve Tribes of Israel.

Planetary correspondences

Each of the ten sephirot corresponds to an astrological feature. These astrological correspondences exist in the world of Assiah, the lowest of the Four Worlds of kabbalah.

Mystical connection of Scriptures and Menorah to the 7 Classical Planets and Lunar Phases
The ancient Hebrews were well aware of the Sun, Moon, and five planets seen with the naked eye and Hebrew mysticism recognized their great importance. Therefore, along with the 4 lunar phases being slightly over 7 days (~7.4 days) each, the number 7 was held in very high regard. The Torah reflects this with (Genesis 1:1) being 7 words and 28 letters (7x4) in its original Hebrew. This is known as God's signature.

Genesis 1:14, "And God said, 'Let there be lights in the heavens to separate the day from the night, and let them serve as signs to mark seasons, days, years and festivals'...the 4th day (of 7)." The #7 is the great recurring numerical theme of the Hebrew (and Christian) scriptures. The menorah's 7 lamps on 6 branches correspond to the lights of the 7 Classical planets: Moon, Mercury, Venus, Sun (4th), Mars, Jupiter, and Saturn.

See also

 Astrology in medieval Islam
 Philip Berg
 Christian views on astrology
 Gematria
 Hebrew astronomy
 Jewish astrology
 Kabbalah
 Mazzaroth
 Monen
 Renaissance magic
 Sefer Raziel HaMalakh
 Sefer Yetzirah

References

 Altmann, A. “Astrology,” Encyclopaedia Judaica (Jerusalem: Keter, 1973), vol. 3, pp. 788–795
 Amsel, Nachum. The Jewish Encyclopedia of Moral and Ethical Issues", Jason Aronson, 1994
 Charlesworth, James H. “Jewish Astrology in the Talmud, the Pseudepigrapha, the Dead Sea Scrolls, and Early Palestinian Synagogues,” Harvard Theological Review 70 (1977), 183-200
 Erlanger, Gad. Signs of the Times: the Zodiac in Jewish Tradition (New York, NY: Feldheim, 2001)
 Julius Guttman. Philosophies of Judaism, JPS. 1964
 Kaplan, Aryeh. Sefer Yetzirah: The Book of Creation, Weiser Books, Revised edition (May 1, 1997) 
 Kiener, Ronald. “The Status of Astrology in the Early Kabbalah: From the Sefer Yesirah to the Zohar.” In The Beginnings of Jewish Mysticism in Europe: Proceedings of the Second International Conference on the History of Jewish Mysticism (Jerusalem Studies in Jewish Thought, vol. VI), edited by J. Dan. Jerusalem: Magnes, 1987: 1*-42* (English section).
 Langermann, Y. Tzvi. "Maimonides Repudiation of Astrology," in Robert S. Cohen, & Hillel Levine (eds.), Maimonides and the Sciences (Dordrecht: Kluwer Academic Press, 2000), pp. 131–157
 Ness, Lester. "Jewish Astrology," in Written in the Stars: Ancient Zodiac Mosaics (Warren Center, Pennsylvania: Shangri-La Publications, 1999), pp. 137–174.
 Pines, Shlomo. "To Behold the Stars and the Heavenly Bodies," Immanuel 20 (1986), pp. 33–37 (also in Shlomo Pines Studies in the History of Jewish Thought (ed. by Warren Zev Harvey and Moshe Idel (Jerusalem: Magnes Press, 1997)))
 Stuckrad, Kocku von. "Jewish and Christian Astrology in Late Antiquity – A New Approach," Numen 47/1 (2000), pp. 1–40.
 The Jewish Encyclopedia (1906), Astrology
 “Gersonides on Astrology, Divination, and Dreams,” in Proceedings, Eighth World Congress of Jewish Studies, Division C, World Union of Jewish Studies, Jerusalem, 1982, pp. 47–52.
 Divination, Magic and Healing: A Book of Jewish Folklore, Jason Aronson
 The Mystical Qabalah, Dion Fortune, Samuel Weiser publisher, 1984

Further reading
 Anderson, Carl. Astrology of the Old Testament, Or: The Lost Word Regained. Kessinger Publishing: USA, 1997. .
 Berg, Philip. Astrology, the Star Connection: The Science of Judaic Astrology. Research Centre of Kabbalah: USA, 1987. .
 Berg, Philip. Kabbalistic Astrology Made Easy. Research Centre of Kabbalah: USA, 1999. .
 Berg, Rav P. S. Kabbalistic Astrology: And the Meaning of Our Lives. Kabbalah Publishing: USA, 2006. .
 Dobin, Joel C. Kabbalistic Astrology: The Sacred Tradition of the Hebrew Sages. Inner Traditions: USA, 1999. .
 Ezra, Abraham Ben Meir Ibn. The Beginning of Wisdom (Reshith Hochma). ARHAT Publications: USA, 1998. .
 Ezra, Abraham Ben Meir Ibn. The Book of Reasons (Sefer Ha'te'amim). The Golden Hind Press: USA, 1994.
 Glazerson, Matityahu. Above the Zodiac: Astrology in Jewish Thought. Aronson Publishers: USA, 1996. .
 Levy, Raphael. The Astrological Works of Abraham Ibn Ezra. Johns Hopkins Press: Baltimore, 1927.
 Mashallah ibn Athari. On Reception. ARHAT Publications: USA, 1997. .
 Molnar, Michael. The Star of Bethlehem: The Legacy of the Magi. Rutgers University Press: USA. 1999.
 Wedel, Theodore Otto. Astrology in the Middle Ages''. Dover Publications: Mineola, 2005. .

External links
 Research sources for Jewish astrology
 Article by Robert Zoller
 Jewish Astrology article, the Jewish Encyclopedia
 Jewish Astronomy article, the Jewish Encyclopedia
 Astrology - Kabbalah Center
 Review of "The Secrets of the Stars" by Rabbi Ari Storch
 Response by Rabbi Ari Stroch to review of his book
 Astrological Correspondences in the Sepher Yetsira

Jewish astrology
Astrology
Astrology
Astrology